Albuquerque tile factory is a tile factory located currently at Hoige Bazaar, Bolar, Mangalore, Karnataka, India. It is the only tile factory whose tiles are recommended for Government buildings.

History
The firm, A. Albuquerque & Sons, was established in 1868, by Alex Albuquerque Pai. It has since been passed down through the family for four generations of Albuquerque men. Presently, the factory is owned by George Albuquerque Pai.

References

Companies based in Mangalore
Manufacturing companies of India
Indian companies established in 1868 
Manufacturing companies established in 1868